Club Deportivo Pamplona is a Spanish sports club based in Pamplona, in the autonomous community of Navarre  
currently  play in 3rd - Group 15, holding home games at Beitikuntzea - Lizasoáin, a stadium with 1,000 seats.

Across different eras, future international players Jesús María Satrústegui, Nacho Monreal and Iñaki Williams learned their skills in the youth sections of the club.

History
CD Pamplona was founded on October 31, 1958. Since the green color was already occupied it was decided to use the green diagonal stripe as the sign of the city to represent the club's identity. In the 2018-19 season the club finished 17th in the Tercera División, Group 15.

Season to season

10 seasons in Tercera División

Juan Angel Seguro

Men's baseball

The men's baseball team it plays in División de Honor de Béisbol.

Season to season

References

External links
Official website  
Futbolme team profile  

Football clubs in Navarre
Sport in Pamplona
Association football clubs established in 1958
1958 establishments in Spain
Baseball teams in Spain
Sports teams in Navarre